The Caribbean Democrat Union is an alliance of moderate, centre-right and conservative political parties and individuals the Caribbean. It is affiliated to the global International Democrat Union.

Member parties/individuals

External links
 Caribbean Democrat Union webpage on the IDU official website

International Democrat Union
Politics of the Caribbean
Conservatism in North America